() is a Japanese phrase meaning "Thanks a lot" or "Thank you very much". 

Domo arigato may also refer to:

Film 
 Domo Arigato (film), a 1972 Japanese 3-D film

Music 
 Domo arigato, a catchphrase in the 1983 song "Mr. Roboto" by Styx
 Domo Arigato, a 1985 album by the Durutti Column
 "Domo arigato", a 2009 song from You Make Me Feel (Bonfire album)